Hualien City (Wade-Giles: Hua¹-lien² Shih⁴; Hokkien POJ: Hoa-lian-chhī or Hoa-liân-chhī) is a county-administered city and the county seat of Hualien County, Taiwan. It is located on the east coast of Taiwan on the Pacific Ocean, and has a population of 99,516 inhabitants.

Name
Hualien County annals record that the city was called "Kilai" until the early twentieth century. This name refers to the Sakiraya Taiwanese aborigines and their settlement.

After World War II the incoming Kuomintang-led Republic of China retained the Kanji spelling but shortened the name to just , or Hualien via Chinese romanization.

History
The Spaniards built mines for gold in Hualien in 1622. Permanent settlements began in 1851, when 2,200 Han Chinese farmers led by Huang A-fong (黃阿鳳) from Taipei arrived at Fengchuan (now the area near Hualien Rear Station). In 1875, more farmers, led by Lin Cang-an (林蒼安) from Yilan, settled at Fengchuan.

Settlements in the area remained small by the start of Japanese rule. In 1940, the town was upgraded to Karenkō City, Karenkō Prefecture.

On 25 October 1945, Taiwan was handed over from Japan to the Republic of China under Kuomintang government. In January 1946, the incoming Kuomintang designated Hualien City a county-administered city of Hualien County and to be the county seat.

Climate
Hualien experiences a tropical monsoon climate (Am) with frequent cyclones, as it borders the Pacific Ocean. It closely borders on a humid subtropical climate. The city experiences significant rainfall year-round and the temperature there averages . Precipitation in the city averages . January is the city's driest month, while September tends to be the wettest.

Subdivisions 

The 45 villages of the city are divided into six village unions: (in Hanyu Pinyin)

 The first union: Minyun, Minle, Minxiang, Minyi, Minxin, Minli, Minde, Minzheng, Minqin, Minxiao
 The second union: Minsheng, Minquan, Minzu, Minyou, Minzhu, Minzhi
 The third union: Zhuji, Zhuyi, Zhuxin, Zhuqin, Zhushang, Zhugong
 The fourth union: Zhuxue, Zhuquan, Zhunong, Zhuhe, Zhuli, Zhu'an, Zhumu
 The fifth union: Guofeng, Guofang, Guozhi, Guoguang, Guohun, Guo'an, Guowei, Guohua, Guolian, Guosheng
 The sixth union: Guofu, Guoyu, Guoqing, Guoqiang, Guofu, Guoxing

The newest villages from 2002 are Guosheng, Guoxing, Minxiao, and Minzhu.

Government institutions
 Hualien County Government
 Hualien County Council

Demographics
Hualien City has 9,000 aboriginal people, making it the city with the largest aboriginal population in Taiwan. The majority of the aborigines that reside in Hualien include the Amis, Atayal, Truku and Bunun. Hualien City is also the most densely populated area in Hualien county.

Education

There are 3 universities, 12 senior high schools, 4 junior high schools, 16 elementary schools.

Universities
 National Dong Hwa University, Meilun campus
 Tzu Chi University
 Tzu Chi University of Science and Technology

High schools
 National Hualien Senior High School
 Tzu Chi High School

Industries
Hualien City is the center of politics, economy and transportation of Hualien County.

Medical care
 Hualien Tzu Chi Medical Center (First Medical Center in Eastern Taiwan)
 Mennonite Christian Hospital
 Hualien Hospital, Department of Health, Execusive Yuan

Tourist attractions
Hualien is most famous as the jumping off point for Taroko Gorge National Park. Taroko Gorge is billed as the largest marble canyon in the world. Tours from Hualien City are available in large bus tours or smaller group or private tours. Taroko Gorge features suspension bridges, trails, rivers, waterfalls and more.
 Dongdamen Night Market
 Hualien Al-Falah Mosque
 Hualien Baseball Stadium
 Hualien County Stone Sculptural Museum
 Hualien Cultural and Creative Industries Park
 Hualien Martyrs' Shrine
 Hualien Railway Culture Park
 Pine Garden
 North Beach Park (Beibin Park)
 South Beach Park and Night Market (Nanbin Park)
 Meilun Mountain Park
 Hualien Fish Market
 Old Railroad Cultural Shopping Street
 Rock Street
 Whale Watching
 Jing Si Hall (Meditation Hall) of the Tzu Chi Foundation
Gong Tian Temple

Transportation

Air
Hualien City is served by Hualien Airport located at the neighboring Xincheng Township of Hualien County. The airport is about 10 minutes drive to the city.

Rail
 Hualien Station, TRA North-Link Line and Hualien–Taitung Line

Sea
The Port of Hualien is an international port in the city with liners sailing to Japan, Middle East, South East Asia and South Korea.

Road
 Provincial Highway No. 9
 Provincial Highway No. 11
 County Road No.193

Notable natives
 Hsieh Chia-hsien, baseball player
 Huang Teng-hui, artist and entrepreneur
 Lin Man-ting, football and futsal player
 Yeh Kuang-shih, Deputy Mayor of Kaohsiung (2018–2020)
 Yang Mu, poet, writer

Gallery

Twin towns – sister cities
Hualien City is twinned with:
 Ulsan, South Korea (1982)
 Yonaguni, Japan (1982)
 Albuquerque, United States (1983)
 Bellevue, United States (1984)
 Oudtshoorn, South Africa (1985)

Friendly cities
Hualien City has friendly relations with:
 Takachiho, Japan (2005)
 Saipan, Northern Mariana Islands, United States (2007)

See also

 List of East Asian ports
 2018 Hualien earthquake

References

External links

 
 

 
Populated places in Hualien County